P. T. Parameshwar Naik is an Indian politician from the state of Karnataka. He is a member of the Karnataka Legislative Assembly representing the Hoovina Hadagali constituency.

Political career
Naik is from the Indian National Congress. He is the Minister for Labour in the K. Siddaramaiah led Karnataka Government.

Controversy
It was alleged that he abruptly transferred a senior police official Anupama Shenoy for not attending his phone call.

External links 
 Karnataka Legislative Assembly

References 

1950s births
Living people
Karnataka MLAs 2013–2018
Indian National Congress politicians
People from Bellary district
Year of birth missing (living people)
Karnataka MLAs 2018–2023